The phainopepla or northern phainopepla (Phainopepla nitens) is the most northerly representative of the mainly tropical Central American family Ptiliogonatidae, the silky flycatchers. Its name is from the Greek  meaning "shining robe" in reference to the male's plumage.

Description

Its bill is short and slender. The male is glossy black, and has a white wing patch that is visible when it flies; the female is plain gray and has a lighter gray wing patch. Both sexes have red eyes, but these are more noticeable in the female than the male.

Range and habitat
The phainopepla ranges as far north as central California with the San Joaquin Valley and southern Utah, and south to central Mexico, the interior Mexican Plateau region; the southern edge of the plateau, the transverse mountains is its non-breeding home. It is found in hot areas, including desert oases, and is readily seen in the deserts of Arizona, southern Nevada, and southern California; also the Baja Peninsula, both Baja California-(north), and Baja California Sur where they are the only breeding resident birds. Extreme individuals have travelled as far as Canada, with one bird in 2009 reaching as far north as Brampton, Ontario, Canada.

Diet
Their diet consists of berries, any small insects, fruits, vegetables. Phainopepla have a specialized mechanism in their gizzard that shucks berry skins off the fruit and packs the skins separately from the rest of the fruit into the intestines for more efficient digestion. So far this is the only known bird able to do this. They appear to relish the fruit of Phoradendron californicum, the desert mistletoe.

Reproduction
It nests in the spring. The eggs are gray or pink and speckled, and the incubation, done by both the male and female, takes fifteen days. The young will be reared by the parents for up to nineteen more days.

Song
Phainopeplas have been found to imitate the calls of twelve other species, such as the red-tailed hawk (Buteo jamaicensis) and the northern flicker (Colaptes auratus).

References

Further reading

Books

External links

 
 
 
 
 
 

Ptiliogonatidae
Monotypic bird genera
Endemic birds of Southwestern North America
Native birds of the Southwestern United States
Fauna of the Colorado Desert
Fauna of the Sonoran Desert
Fauna of the Chihuahuan Desert
Birds of Mexico
San Joaquin Valley
Birds described in 1838